Ben Bates (born June 12, 1961) is an American professional golfer who has played on the Nationwide Tour and the PGA Tour.

Bates was a member of the Nationwide Tour from 1990–97 and 2001–09 and a member of PGA Tour from 1998-2001. Bates is the Nationwide Tour's all-time cuts (226) and starts (410). He played in his 1,000th round on tour in 2007. Bates has won two events on the Nationwide Tour including the 1997 Wichita Open where he defeated Carl Paulson, Jeff Brehaut and Chris Smith in a four-man playoff. He also won The Reese's Cup Classic in a playoff in 2004. Bates was a member of the NCAA Division II championship team at Troy State University and won five collegiate tournaments.  Bates made his first PGA Tour appearance since 2001 at the 2010 Transitions Championship.

Bates now resides in Pensacola, Florida where he operates Marcus Pointe Golf Club.

Professional wins (2)

Nationwide Tour wins (2)

Nationwide Tour playoff record (2–0)

Results in major championships

Note: Bates only played in the U.S. Open.
CUT = missed the half-way cut

See also
1997 Nike Tour graduates
1999 PGA Tour Qualifying School graduates

External links

American male golfers
PGA Tour golfers
PGA Tour Champions golfers
Korn Ferry Tour graduates
Golfers from Florida
Troy University alumni
People from Quincy, Florida
1961 births
Living people